The SEAT León, also spelled Leon in some other languages (named after the city of León, which also means "Lion" in Spanish), is a hatchback compact car built by the Spanish car manufacturer SEAT since October 1999.

The first two León generations used two differing variants of the Volkswagen Group A platform, and shared many components with other Volkswagen Group cars. The third and fourth (current) generation use the Volkswagen Group MQB platform, also used by the Audi A3 Mk3 and Mk4, Volkswagen Golf Mk7 and Mk8 and Škoda Octavia Mk3, Mk4.

First generation (1M; 1999)

The initial SEAT León (Volkswagen Group Typ 1M), launched in 1999, available only as hatchback, and the related saloon version was known as the SEAT Toledo.  It was based on the Volkswagen Group A4 (PQ34) platform and, as such, shared many components in common with other VW Group models such as the Volkswagen Golf Mk4, Bora and Audi A3.  It was mainly produced at SEAT's Martorell plant with a small number of 13,401 cars assembled in 2000 at VW group's plant in Belgium. As SEAT's first C-segment model as part of the VW Group, the León Mk1 was marketed as a sportier and cheaper variant of the Golf.  To reinforce the sporty image, the vehicle had slightly more aggressive looks.  The more expensive versions were equipped with relatively more powerful internal combustion engines, along with firmer suspension to improve handling.  In the interior, the dashboard was derived from that of the first-generation Audi A3.

It became first available in only three body paints (red, yellow, black),  picked as an homage to the colors of both Spain's and Germany's national flags referring back to the roots of the joint project the model originally was.

In some countries, there was also a "Cupra 4"; equipped with a 2.8-litre VR6 delivering  and equipped with four-wheel drive (4WD), based on the same Haldex Traction multi-plate clutch as the Volkswagen Golf 4motion.

A range of turbocharged direct injection (TDI) diesel engines was available, including a  version of Volkswagen Group's 1.9 TDI engine, originally sold as a "Cupra 4 TDI", with 4WD, that was sold for one year only, and only in certain countries, then passed to "Evolution" series, then "Top Sport", and later rebranded as the "FR" ('Formula Racing'). In other countries the model was badged "Cupra" and then "FR" before a limited number of cars were fitted with the bodykit from the petrol powered "Cupra R" and named the "FR+".

All engines over  have a standard six-speed manual transmission. Rear suspension was by semi-independent torsion beam for most variants, whilst high-end and 4WD models were fitted with a multi-link independent rear suspension.  All versions came with disc brakes on all four wheels (the front ventilated, and in some cars the rear too).

In Mexico, the León became a very popular car with upper class young people.  The only problem the León has suffered in Mexico is the fact that the sport tuned suspension of the León is not designed to withstand the constant road imperfections such as potholes and speed bumps that abound in Mexican roads.

In Switzerland, there was another official version tuned by Abt Sportsline of the León called "SEAT León Cupra 4 Kompressor".

Factory production of the Typ 1M ended in May 2006.  However, the appreciation for the SEAT León Cupra R Mk1's appeal remained clear, still up to the 'best hot hatchback of all time' poll, conducted in 2010 by Autocar, in which its readers honoured the Cupra R #7, in the top ten list of hatchbacks of all time in their preferences.

Awards

'Carro do Ano' (Car of the Year) award in 2001, in Portugal
'Most Satisfactory Car of the Year 2007' in Poland, by the Polish magazine Auto Swiat

Engine choices
The Typ 1M SEAT León was available with the following internal combustion engines, with most being shared from other marques of the Volkswagen Group:

Second generation (1P; 2005)

The second generation León, Typ 1P, was released in 2005, with factory production commencing May 2005.  It was based on the Volkswagen Group A5 (PQ35) platform, most notably used by the Volkswagen Golf Mk5.  It was built in Spain, and had a sharper exterior look with vertically parked windscreen wipers, and the external rear door handles more integrated, in a similar style to that seen on recent Alfa Romeo models.  Design was handled by Walter de'Silva, and the car used the same design style that started with the SEAT Altea.

In some markets (e.g. Greece, Romania and Italy), the Leon was available with a 1.4-litre MPI engine producing . The sportier variants began with the  2.0-litre Fuel Stratified Injection (FSI) and the popular  2.0-litre Turbocharged Direct Injection (TDI) diesel engine. Both were fitted with a standard six-speed manual transmission, with the six-speed or seven-speed Direct-Shift Gearbox (DSG) available as an option. A  variant of the 2.0 TFSI unique to the León was later introduced, but despite a low list price and rapid performance – attracted only minimal attention and average reviews, so this was later discontinued to make way for the sportier FR variants.

The first real sporty León within the new range was the León FR with twin-exhaust pipes to left rear, sport seats and gear stick with FR logo to distinguish it from lesser models, was introduced in June 2006, when it finally received the  2.0 TFSI engine from the Volkswagen Golf Mk5 GTI, as well as a  variant of the 2.0 TDI unit featured in the Golf and Audi A3.  Further standard equipment included climate control air conditioning.

Next in the range was the 2.0 TFSI Cupra model. It features a  engine, and a 0- time of 6.4 seconds.  The Cupra came with standard 18" 5 twin-spoke alloys, red brake calipers, and the standard Cupra oval exhaust, as well as new, unique paint finishes and bolstered sport seats complete with the Cupra logo.  Also standard were drilled-aluminium sports pedals.

From 2008, the K1 variant of the León Cupra was introduced in the UK, featuring extensively reworked front and rear bumpers, side skirts, a more pronounced tailgate spoiler.  It also gained a unique chrome-tipped, centrally-mounted, oval exhaust.  The K1 was considered to be a limited edition model, only available in the UK market for the year 2008–2009.

In 2009, the SEAT León Cupra was turned into a race car in the SEAT Cupra race mobile game for Apple iPhone/iPod Touch available through the iTunes' App store. In the same year, the Leon range received a facelift.

Awards
'Red dot' award in 2006 
'Best Car of the Year 2009' for the import compact car segment in Germany, by the German magazine Auto-motor-und-sport
'Firmenauto des Jahres 2006', by the German magazine Firmenauto
'Car of the Year 2006' in Denmark
'Diesel Car of the Year 2006' in Scotland (for the 170 hp 2.0 TDI León FR) 
'Auto 1' of the Year 2006 in Spain, by the magazine Auto Bild
'University Car of the Year 2007' in Spain, by Spanish university students 
'Hellenic Car of the Year 2007'
'GTI of the Year 2006–2007' in Greece for the SEAT León Cupra, by the Greek magazine 4-Trohoi

Special editions

Copa Edition

In 2008, SEAT Deutschland announced the production of 55 units of the SEAT León Copa Edition. The suspension was from Eibach derived from the León Supercopa, and the brakes had been improved to cope with the enhanced performance from the uprated engine. In addition, the car included xenon HID headlights, 18 inch wheels and a spoiler with larger air intakes. The car colour was white with black stripes.

SEAT México announced the production of 100 units of the Copa Edition in orange colour with black stripes in September 2008.  The Mexican version had a sunroof, whilst the European León Copa did not.

Streetcopa and World Champion Edition
At the 2008 Geneva Auto Show, the León Streetcopa limited edition was released.  It was a similar edition of León Copa Edition with some changes, designed for the Swiss market and limited to 200 units.  Lately, after SEAT won World Touring Car Championship, SEAT Schweiz released a facelifted version called Leon World Champion Edition, also limited to 200 units.

Cupra 310 Limited Edition
The production was limited to 100 units.

It came only in Candy white or Infiri black. The Cupra 310 Limited Edition featured beside the OEM Cupra equipment an engine management remapping by Abt Sportsline, black Orion-alloy wheels, an alarm system, Bluetooth connectivity and special 310 Limited Edition badges on the sides and the rear hatch. There were also stainless decals inside the front door frames displaying the 310 Ltd logo. A badge on the dashboard displayed the serial number, and the car was delivered with a key ring to match.

Cupra Pies Descalzos
In 2007, SEAT prepared a sole car customized by Shakira.  This car was auctioned, and the benefits went to the charity through Pies Descalzos Foundation.  Mechanically, it is the same car as the León Cupra.

León Twin Drive concepts
SEAT produced two versions of the Twin Drive prototype. Initially announced in May 2009 as a diesel/battery hybrid, the León Twin Drive Ecomotive was a series plug-in hybrid, powered by an electric motor, through lithium-ion batteries chargeable at a regular electrical socket, in combination with a diesel-powered internal combustion engine.  The Twin Drive Ecomotive project was a first step towards a 100% electric car and was planned to go into production in 2014.

The Twin Drive Ecomotive as a plug-in hybrid vehicle powered through the combination of both a diesel engine and an electric motor. Quick battery recharging process from the mains through regular power sockets features.

Engine specifications
The Typ 1P SEAT León is available with the following internal combustion engines, and like the previous generation, many are shared from other marques of the Volkswagen Group:

A flexible-fuel vehicle model is also on offer under the label "MultiFuel", featuring the 1.6 MPI E85 102 bhp engine.

See also
Driver Steering Recommendation

Third generation (5F; 2012)

The third generation of the León is based on the Volkswagen Group's latest MQB platform, which is shared with the seventh generation Volkswagen Golf.

The first official information and pictures of the car were released on 16 July 2012, with its public debut at the 2012 Paris Motor Show in September. It is the second car to be based on the MQB platform.

It features new safety equipment, such as driver knee airbag, and a number of new safety systems, including (often as standard) a multi-collision braking system to automatically brake the car after an accident in order to avoid a second collision, a lane-keeping assistant, and driver fatigue detection. The braking system includes a hill-start assistant.

In the interior, there is a driver-oriented centre console hosting a 5.8-inch touch-screen infotainment display with some models featuring a proximity sensor, also used in the Volkswagen Golf, as well as ambient lighting.

A new feature available for the first time in its class are the optional full-LED headlamps combined with a full beam assistant. The full-LED headlamps offer numerous advantages over standard halogen bulbs such as improved illumination, a close to daylight colour temperature, lower energy consumption and an extended service life. The front fog lights can include a cornering feature.

The higher specification also have a new "SEAT Drive Profile" system which allows the driver to choose between four different driving settings: eco, normal, sport, and an individual setting. This system controls the behaviour of the engine, steering, and DSG gearbox. Additionally, the 1.8 TSI 180PS and 2.0 TDI 184PS engine-equipped models will vary their engine sound via a sound actuator, as well as their interior ambient lighting between white (normal, eco and individual) and red (sport).

SEAT announced in early 2012 that the range would include for the first time three-door and estate models in addition to a five-door.

In September 2013, SEAT officially unveiled the León ST (estate model) at the Frankfurt Motor Show. The León ST extends the León's maximum load capacity to 1470 litres and is available in Europe in three different versions and eleven different engine options. On 23 June 2014, SEAT revealed an off-road version of the León ST called the X-PERIENCE.

In August 2018, SEAT discontinued the Léon SC due to lower demands for three-door hatchbacks.

Facelift 
In January 2017, the León received a subtle facelift which included a reshaped front bumper with a grille that has been stretched by 40mm and features restyled LED headlights. New engine options available included a 115 bhp 1.0-litre three-cylinder turbo petrol and 115 bhp 1.6-litre diesel. Interior changes included an electric parking brake with Hill Hold Control (HHC) as standard, a larger eight-inch touchscreen infotainment system with Apple CarPlay, Android Auto and MirrorLink.

New safety systems included Traffic Sign Recognition, Pedestrian Protection System, and blind-spot warning systems. Also available was Traffic Jam Assist - which allows the León to accelerate and brake automatically in traffic jams up to 37 mph. "Kessy" - SEAT's keyless automatic locking and starting system was another upgrade available. A new flagship XCELLENCE trim level was also introduced.

León Cupra 
SEAT León Cupra 265, was produced from 2014 to 2016, fitted with a turbocharged 265 bhp 2 Litre 16v Inline 4 petrol engine, capable of 0-62 mph in 6.2 seconds and with a maximum speed of 155 mph. Available with a 6-speed manual gearbox or 6-speed DSG automatic gearbox.

SEAT León Cupra 280, was manufactured between 2014 and 2015, powered by a turbocharged 276 bhp 2 Litre 16v Inline 4 petrol engine, capable of 0-62 mph in 5.8 seconds and limited to 155 mph. Available with either a 6-speed manual gearbox or 6-speed DSG automatic gearbox. The 280 was fitted with 19-inch alloy wheels and Brembo brakes as standard.

The Sub8 Performance pack was launched in August 2014 for the Cupra 280, it featured side skirts, lightweight 19-inch alloy wheels and 30mm larger ventilated brake discs with Brembo calipers. Michelin Pilot Sport Cup 2 tyres could be ordered at extra cost. Also included is a VAQ electronically controlled limited-slip differential that aids traction. Power remained unchanged at 276 bhp and a 0-60 mph time of 5.7 seconds.

The Ultimate Sub8 pack was launched in February 2015 for the Cupra 280, which included several weight-saving measures including: removing the León's centre armrest, standard climate control system is replaced with a smaller heater, reducing the number of speakers from eight to four, removing the centre console armrest, front storage units, and rear air vents.

SEAT León Cupra 290, was manufactured between 2015 and 2016, as a replacement for Cupra 280 - powered by the same 2Litre engine from the Cupra 280, but with an extra 10 bhp. The Cupra 290 can accelerate 0-62 mph in 5.8 seconds and onto a top speed of 155 mph. Available with either a 6-speed manual gearbox or 6-speed DSG automatic gearbox. The 290 came in three body styles - three-door hatchback (León SC), five-door hatchback (León) and five-door estate (León ST) – and in a higher-specification Black version; which included sports seats, special 19in multi-spoke alloy wheels, and black detailing.

SEAT León Cupra 300, was manufactured between 2017–2018 to replace the Cupra 290, it used the same 2 Litre turbocharged engine from León Cupra 290 but boosted to 296 bhp and capable of 0-62 mph in 5.8 seconds. Available with either a 6-speed manual gearbox or 6-speed DSG automatic gearbox. ST estate version was fitted with a DSG gearbox and all-wheel drive as standard.

In response to new WLTP testing regimes, SEAT announced in 2018 that the León Cupra 300 would be replaced with a new León Cupra 290. Changes to the revised model included the addition of a gasoline particulate filter (GPF), and as the name suggests, gave the 2WD hatchback a 290PS power output. The ST Estate retained its 300 PS power output, but was also fitted with a GPF system.

The León Cupra R is on the standard Cupra 300 but with an uprated 306 bhp 2 Litre turbocharged engine; with a 0-62 mph time of 5.8 seconds and a top speed of 155 mph. Cupra Rs were available only with a six-speed manual gearbox in the UK. External changes include exclusive 19-inch alloy wheels, reprofiled bumpers with larger front intakes, flared side skirts, and carbon fibre front splitter, side skirts, rear diffuser and roof-mounted spoiler.

Safety
In 2012, the SEAT León Mk3 was tested for its safety performance under the Euro NCAP assessment scheme and it achieved a 5-star overall rating: 

In 2013, the Spanish-made SEAT León Mk3 in its most basic Latin American configuration was tested for its safety performance under the Latin NCAP assessment scheme and it achieved 5 stars for adult occupants and 4 stars for toddlers:

In 2015, the Spanish-made SEAT León ST in its most basic Latin American configuration was tested for its safety performance under the Latin NCAP assessment scheme and it achieved 5 stars for adult occupants and 5 stars for toddlers:

Awards
 Euro NCAP advanced reward for SEAT's Multi Collision Brake system 
 Euro NCAP advanced reward for SEAT's Lane Assist system

Special Editions

León CONNECT
The SEAT León CONNECT is a special edition model that was released in 2015. It is equipped with SEAT's Full Link Technology and a Samsung Galaxy A3 smartphone. This technology allows the user's phone to be connected to the car's infotainment system and gives the user access to all the features of the SEAT ConnectApp. The SEAT León CONNECT has a range of exterior body colours that allow the mirrors and wheels to be customised. Interior details, including stitching are in Blue.

Limited Editions
SEAT León Cupra ST 300 Carbon Edition went on sale in 2018 with only 50 allocated for sale in the United Kingdom. Based on the León ST Cupra 300, the Carbon Edition is fitted with the same 296 bhp 2.0-litre four-cylinder petrol engine mated to a six-speed DSG gearbox and Haldex all-wheel-drive system. Capable of 0-62 mph in 4.9 seconds and a top speed that is limited to 155 mph. Only available in Monsoon Grey paintwork, while other new exterior touches include carbon front and rear diffusers, fibre side blades, and Cupra R 19-inch black and bright silver alloy wheels.

Seat León Cupra R Abt 4Drive ST was produced in 2019 and its 2lt engine power increased from 296 bhp to 345 bhp and 0-62 mph in 4.5 seconds; top speed is limited to 155 mph. The ABT upgrade includes a copper body kit, 19-inch alloy wheels, Brembo brakes, and quad exhausts; the front splitter and rear diffuser, side skirts, and roof-mounted spoiler are all finished in carbon fibre. A seven-speed dual-clutch automatic gearbox and four-wheel drive are fitted as standard. To improve cornering speed and handling performance, new uprights have been added that modifies the negative camber to 2 degrees, at the front and back. Only 150 were allocated for sale in the United Kingdom.

Engine specifications

The Typ 5F SEAT León is available with the following internal combustion engines all featuring direct injection and turbocharging, and like the previous generations they are shared with other marques of the Volkswagen Group:

Fourth generation (KL1/KL8; 2020)

A fourth generation of León was presented on 28 January 2020. It shares the MQB platform with the Volkswagen Golf Mk8, Skoda Octavia Mk4 and Audi A3 Mk4. It has an all digital cluster, is full LED-Light equipped and will have a wide range of gasoline, diesel, plug-in hybrid and electric engines.

The fourth-generation León is 16mm narrower and 90mm longer than the previous generation of León. The five-door León boot capacity of 380 litres has remained unchanged, and the Estate's storage is increased by 30 litres to 617 litres compared to the previous generation.

Engine options are two petrol TSI engines – a 1-litre three-cylinder producing 108 bhp and a 1.5-litre four-cylinder with either 128 bhp or 148 bhp. The TDI diesel option is a 2-litre producing either 113 bhp or 148 bhp.

Also available is a (CNG) compressed natural gas 1.5 litre TGI unit that produces 96 kW/130PS of power giving the CNG-powered SEAT León a CNG range of 440 km (273 miles). When CNG tanks are depleted, the engine switches automatically to run on petrol until the next CNG refuelling.

The eTSI mild hybrid has a 48v electric motor and is available with either the 109 bhp 1-litre or 148 bhp 1.5 litre petrol engine. The system allows the León to coast with the engine switched off during some driving scenarios and recover energy under braking which is then stored in a 48V lithium-ion battery.

Plug-in Hybrid (eHybrid) 1.4-litre TSI petrol engine electric motor with a 13kWh lithium-ion battery to produce 150 kW/204PS of power, switching to petrol only when its battery needs recharging to produce an electric-only 60 km (38 miles) range. Charging is quoted at just 3.5 hours via a 3.6 kW AC socket; it takes 6 hours to charge it from a 230V socket.

The engines can be chosen with a six-speed manual, a six-speed DSG (direct shift gearbox) automatic transmission or 7-speed dual-clutch automatic transmission on smaller engines that have a torque output of up to 250Nm/184 lb ft. The 7-speed dual-clutch automatic transmission's dry clutch technology results in weight savings, reduced fuel consumption and emissions.

Standard equipment include: "Kessy" automatic locking and starting system, electronic parking brake, an eight-inch infotainment system, 2 x USB points, LED headlights with automatic high beam, electric and heated side mirrors, cloth upholstery, leather steering wheel and gear stick, and SEAT Connect.

The León is available in seven trim levels, starting with: SE with 16" alloys wheels, 8.25" touchscreen media system and rear parking sensors; SE Dynamic adds 17" alloys wheels, digital Cockpit, 10" touchscreen media system and Park assist (including front and rear parking sensor);  FR adds  FR Styling, sports suspension, automatic headlights, and Rain sensing wipers; FR First Edition adds 18" alloy wheels, predictive & adaptive Cruise Control, rear view camera and wireless phone charger; FR Sport adds heated front seats, Lane Assist and rear tinted windows; XCELLENCE adds microsuede upholstery and KESSY Advanced (keyless entry and start); and XCELLENCE Lux adds 18" Aerodynamic Performance alloy wheels, leather upholstery and interior wraparound lighting.

Safety
Standard equipment include: Blind Spot Detection, Exit Assist (alerts driver to any approaching vehicles visually and acoustically; stopping the car if necessary), Collision Assist (if an imminent collision is detected, sensors prepare the vehicle and its occupants by pre-tensioning seat belts and closing windows), Emergency Assist (if the driver seems inactive behind the wheel, it will activate the hazard lights, keep the car in its lane and then will apply the brakes until the car is brought to a gentle stop) and Predictive Adaptive Cruise Control.

Seven airbags, including a new standard front-central airbag that prevents possible head injuries between the driver and front passenger in the event of a side collision, are now standard.

In 2020, the SEAT León Mk4 was tested for its safety performance under the Euro NCAP assessment scheme and it achieved a 5-star overall rating:

Technology
The León features digital cockpit on all but the basic model; Full Link technology with MirrorLink, Android Auto and Apple CarPlay - compatible with most smartphones on the market. The standard Infotainment system boasts an 8.25" screen, whilst higher spec models have the larger 10" screen Navi system that offers 3D connected navigation and voice control as well as gesture recognition. The optional Connectivity Box allows wireless phone charging. Two USB type C ports are fitted as standard in the front cabin, with higher trim models having an additional two ports in the rear cabin. eSIM which features eCall service as standard will contact the emergency services directly in case of a serious accident.

Optional equipment
Optional features (some of which are standard on higher models) include Rear View Camera, BeatsAudio 9-speaker sound system, Park Assist, leather sport seats, and LED exterior lighting with automatic headlight adjustment.

Optional equipment could be ordered individually or combined into packages were also available at extra cost.

The 'Winter Pack' includes Heated front seats, wash water and steering wheel.

The 'Convenience Pack' includes Rain and auto-dimming light sensor with Coming and Leaving Home, windshield wiper intermittent control and breakaway interior rearview mirror.

The 'Safe Pack' includes Forward collision warning with braking reaction to vehicles, cyclists and pedestrians. It includes multi-functional camera, speed limiter, lane keeping system and driver alert system.

Cupra León
The León is also produced under SEAT's sister brand, Cupra and is available in 242 bhp or 296 bhp 2.0-litre turbocharged petrol engines. For a lower centre of gravity, the Cupra León sits 25mm lower at the front and 20mm lower at the rear compared to the regular Seat León.

Top of the range is the estate-only 306 bhp Cupra ST 4Drive, with four-wheel-drive system and a DSG 'box. Performance figures for this Cupra ST 4Drive are rated at 4.8sec to 62mph, while top speed is limited to 155mph.

The Cupra León (PHEV) e-Hybrid's powertrain comprises a 242bhp turbocharged 1.4-litre four-cylinder petrol engine, an 113 horsepower electric motor, and a 13kWh lithium battery pack. The system produces 400Nm of torque, reaching 0–62mph in 6.7 seconds. Seat claim it has a pure electric range of 32 miles, 217.3mpg and a 30g/km of CO2 emissions figure.

Both 242bhp versions are fitted with 18-inch alloy wheels as standard, while the higher-output models are fitted with 19-inch alloy wheels and 370mm front discs with Brembo calipers.

The Cupra León 300TSI went on sale in early 2021 and features a turbocharged 2.0-litre four-cylinder petrol engine which produces 296bhp and 400Nm of torque; 0-62mph time of 5.7 seconds and a top speed of 155mph. Available in two versions: The entry-level VZ2 variant features 19-inch alloy wheels, black brake calipers, a quad exhaust system, and copper-coloured exterior detailing. VZ3 model gets a different set of 19-inch alloys, a wireless phone charger, heated leather seats, and a heated steering wheel.

Awards
The Fourth generation León has won several awards including: Golden Steering Wheel Award for The SEAT León 1.5 eTSI model in the "Best price/product ratio up to 35,000 euros" category. In December 2020, The new SEAT León was voted "AUTOBEST 2021", the European accolade for the "Best Buy Car of Europe 2021". In January 2021, the Seat Leon 1.5 TSI 130 Evo FR was named Family Car of the Year by What Car? magazine. What Car? awarded the León five stars out of five in its review of the car.

SEAT León in motorsport

The first generation SEAT León Cupra R was the basis of a one-make trophy, the SEAT Leon Supercopa. It operated in Spain, UK, Germany and Turkey from 2003. An "International Masters" final, featuring the best four drivers from each national series, was introduced in October 2005, as a support race for the Spanish GT Championship's final round at Montmeló. A TDI-powered version has raced in the ECTS, an Italian-based endurance series for touring cars.

In 2006, the Supercopa León was replaced by the new shape León.

The SEAT Leon Eurocup began in 2008 as a support series for the World Touring Car Championship.

The car came top in Class D in the 2014 Liqui Moly Bathurst 12 Hour.

SEAT León Super 2000 car 
During 2005, SEAT introduced the second generation León into the World Touring Car Championship (WTCC) to replace the Toledo Cupra which it had raced in the early rounds of the title. SEAT Sport, in partnership with Oreca, ran six cars in the WTCC. Two other cars were run by SEAT Sport UK (Northern South) based in Northampton, UK in the British Touring Car Championship (BTCC). A further two cars were run by SEAT Sport Italia in the Italia Superturismo Championship.

In mid-2007 SEAT introduced the León TDI to combat BMW's dominance by utilizing 2.0-liter Volkswagen EA189 TDI inline-4 turbodiesel engine. The car did show promise with Yvan Muller behind the wheel and the team was set to score championship win in Macau, but reliability issues caused Muller an retirement in Race 1 and the engine problems weren't solved in time thus not starting in Race 2 and handing the title to Andy Priaulx with BMW 320si.

In 2008, Muller won the FIA World Touring Car Championship for Drivers at the wheel of a León TDI, and SEAT won the Manufacturers' title. León TDI was also fielded by SEAT UK in the British Touring Car Championship with Jason Plato being the lead driver. Plato finished second behind Fabrizio Giovanardi with Vauxhall in the drivers' championship. At the end of the season SEAT UK withdrew from the series and subsequently this was the only season where León TDI competed in the BTCC.

In 2009, Gabriele Tarquini became the Drivers' Champion with the León TDI, and SEAT won the Manufacturers' title for a second consecutive year. At the end of the season SEAT Sport officially ended their manufacturer support. León TDI cars were entered by Sunred Engineering for the following season and despite not having official manufacturer support from SEAT, in the manufacturers' championship the entity was named SEAT Customers Technology. Tarquini finished second in the drivers' standings behind Yvan Muller with Chevrolet.

For 2011, new rules were introduced in WTCC, incorporating a new engine formula - 1.6 turbocharged engines, similar to those used in the World Rally Championship. In line with the changes Sunred created the SUNRED SR León 1.6T, using the then León TDI as base. The cars, however, were not ready for the start of the season, and Sunred drivers used the older León TDI, which was still eligible to enter thanks to the Jay Ten Trophy, introduced by the series promoter Eurosport for 2010-spec cars.

In 2012, SEAT Sport unofficially returned to the series introducing the SEAT León WTCC, effectively replacing the SR León from Sunred, to privateer entries. Some drivers like Tom Boardman and Tiago Monteiro started the season using the old León TDI. The TDI version was still eligible in the European Touring Car Cup where Fernando Monje won the 2012 championship. For the following season León TDI was banned from ETC Cup and with everyone now upgraded to the León WTCC 2012 marked the last time diesel car was entered in WTCC and ETCC. The Léon WTCC continued to be eligible until the introduction of TC1 in 2014 (although León WTCC was able to be entered in the TC2 class in the same year as TC1's introduction).

León Cup Racer and León TCR 

In 2013 SEAT Sport introduced a concept car, based on the third generation of León. Initially it was thought that this would be the car in which SEAT Sport would return to the series with full manufacturer team under the new TC1 regulations. However SEAT Sport announced that the car would be part of the revived León Eurocup for 2014.

The León Cup Racer then formed the base for the newly formed TCR International Series. The TCR regulations use this car as a template for the aerodynamic portions of the cars. In 2016 SEAT Sport introduced a TCR-spec version of the León with the original Cup Racer still being eligible in the International Series as well as national and regional championship utilising the TCR regulations.

León (NGTC) 

Team HARD Racing built and ran four new Cupra León cars for the 2021 season. The drivers were announced to be Glynn Geddie, Jack Goff, Nicolas Hamilton and Árón Taylor-Smith. As of Brands Hatch race 3, the car has scored points in every race as well as a podium, courtesy of Goff.

León e-Racer (ETCR) 

The Cupra e-Racer is an electric car touring car. It competed in the e-TCR electric touring car racing series, against competitors from Hyundai and Alfa Romeo, securing the manufacturer's championship following the inaugural season in 2021 and the second season in 2022.

Summary

Sales and production figures
Since its launch in 1999, more than 2 million SEAT León cars have been produced and sold in its three generations up to the present, made in SEAT's Martorell plant and other Volkswagen Group's factories.

In the year 2011, the total annual retail sales number of SEAT León cars was 77,075 vehicles, while the annual production of vehicles came up to 80,736 units.

The total production per year of SEAT León cars, manufactured in SEAT and other Volkswagen Group's plants, is shown below :

References

External links

 SEAT Leon – official SEAT UK website
 SEAT Leon in movies and TV series
 SEATCupra.Net UK's #1 SEAT Community
 LeonOC.com León Owners Club
 SEAT Leon ST First Look
 SEAT Leon ST X-perience dimensions
 eHybrid Cupra Leon 

León
León
Compact cars
Euro NCAP small family cars
Latin NCAP small family cars
Hatchbacks
Front-wheel-drive vehicles
Cars powered by VR engines
Plug-in hybrid vehicles
Cars introduced in 1998
2000s cars
2010s cars
2020s cars
Touring cars
Station wagons
Cars of Spain